The Prentiss-Tulford House was a historic house in Columbus, Ohio, United States. The house was built in the 1890s and was listed on the National Register of Historic Places in 1986. The Prentiss-Tulford House was built at a time when East Broad Street was a tree-lined avenue featuring the most ornate houses in Columbus; the house reflected the character of the area at the time.

The house was built in the 1890s and designed with classical and Queen Anne influences. S.G. Prentiss, assistant cashier for the Hayden-Clinton National Bank, lived there from 1910 to 1914.

See also
 National Register of Historic Places listings in Columbus, Ohio

References

Houses completed in 1890
National Register of Historic Places in Columbus, Ohio
Houses in Columbus, Ohio
Houses on the National Register of Historic Places in Ohio
Demolished buildings and structures in Columbus, Ohio
King-Lincoln Bronzeville
Broad Street (Columbus, Ohio)